This Week in Palestine is a monthly magazine that covers cultural, social, and political issues in Palestine. It is published by Sani Meo and has been in regular print since December 1998. Its self-imposed mandate is to promote and document Palestine.

For their March 2018 issue in honor of International Women's Day they partnered with UN Women to publish four articles concerning the advancement of human rights for rural girls and women, implementation of the Sustainable Development Goals (SDGs) in Palestine and sought to improve gender equality by raising awareness to encourage greater participation from men. This campaign was called "Because I am a man".

References

External links

1998 establishments in the Palestinian territories
Arabic-language magazines
Cultural magazines
Magazines established in 1998
Monthly magazines
Mass media in the State of Palestine